Samba is a department of Passoré Province in north central Burkina Faso. Its capital lies at the town of Samba.

Towns and villages

References

Departments of Burkina Faso
Passoré Province